Alexander Leonidovich Mamut also spelled Aleksandr, (born 29 January 1960, Moscow) is a Russian billionaire lawyer, banker and investor. He was until 2020 a co-owner of Rambler Group. He is an Israeli citizen.

In June 2022, Forbes estimated Mamut's net worth at $2 billion.

Early life and education
Alexander Mamut was born on 29 January 1960. His father is Leonid Solomonovich Mamut, a lawyer and one of the authors of the Russian Constitution. His mother, Cicilia Ludwigovna, is a defense attorney. In 1977, Mamut graduated from Moscow gymnasium #17. He studied law at Moscow State University, graduating in 1982.

Career
Mamut began his career as a legal advisor at a printing house.

In 1990, together with Andrey Gloriozonov, Mamut founded "Business and Cooperation” Bank, that was renamed in 1991 into . The bank was founded to service companies in the field of fuel and energy. Its biggest clients were Gazprom and Lukoil.

In 1990 Mamut founded “ALM-Consulting” law firm (ALM abbreviated after Mamut’s name) and served as Managing Partner there throughout 1990–1993. In 1991, ALM Consulting partnered with Frere Cholmeley Bischoff, a law firm based in London and headed by Tim Razzall from 1990 to 1994, in order to establish many offshore shell companies with which ALM Consulting would create the offshore shell company through Frere Cholmeley Bischoff for $300 and then ALM Consulting would sell that same offshore shell company for $5000. In 1993, Roman Kolodkin introduced Mamut to Igor Shuvalov who worked at the Russia's Ministry of Foreign Affairs in the legal department as an attache. According to an interview published in the Russian independent newspaper Meduza, Mamut hired Shuvalov as a senior advisor to ALM. On behalf of the company, Shuvalov conducted special assignments with offshore companies and transported money. Such Russian businessmen as Alisher Usmanov, Roman Abramovich, and Boris Berezovsky were among the largest clients of ALM Consulting in the 1990s.

During the 1990s, Mikhail Kasyanov, while he was the head of the department of external loans and foreign debt at the Russian Ministry of Finance, made decisions in support of Mamut.

Mamut founded the Design Bureau "Company of Project Financing" (KOPF), which is a bank, in 1993, and served as its chief executive officer until 1998. In 1996, KOPF donated 280 million rubles to Boris Yeltsin's election campaign. He was the founder of ALM Development and remained an investor until 2001.

Mamut was Chairman of Moscow Business World (MDM-Bank) or Moskovsky Delovoy Mir (MDM) from 1999 to 2002.

Mamut made donations to Boris Yeltsin's 1996 re-election campaign. He was an economic adviser to the chief of the Russian presidential administration, Alexander Voloshin from 1998 to 1999.

On 31 May 1999, Mamut was elected to the board of directors of Sobinbank.

Mamut’s “A&NN” Investment Company acquired 100% of shares of Evroset from Evgeniy Chichvarkin and Timur Artemiev in 2008. By October 2008, he sold 49.9% to VimpelCom.

Mamut acquired 60% of the Spar Moscow Holding in 2009. He also acquired the “Torpedo-ZIL” football club for the symbolic price of $1. Two years later, in 2011, he invested in the Nomos-Bank. He is a large investor in Ingosstrakh, the insurance company, and Troika-Dialog, an investment bank. He has also invested in Polymetal International, a mining company, and PIK Group, a construction company.

Media
Mamut founded the SUP Company in 2006, and acquired LiveJournal Russia in 2007.

In May 2011, after James Daunt and Alexander Mamut were introduced through a mutual friend, Mamut acquired Waterstones, a UK-based bookstore chain, through Capital Fund Management Limited, a subsidiary of Mamut's A&NN company, for the equivalent of $66 million. Mamut then named James Daunt as the managing director of Waterstones, replacing Dominic Myers. Mamut later sold off a majority stake in April 2018 to Elliott Advisors, valuing the company at $250 million with N M Rothschild & Sons handling the deal, and Elliott retained James Daunt as CEO of Waterstones.

Mamut became the sole owner of the SUP Media in December 2012. In 2013, he acquired Lenta.ru, By 2014, he became the Chairman of Rambler&Co.a Russian news website. In 2014, he fired Galina Timchenko, the editor of Lenta.ru, for publishing an interview with a far-right Ukrainian nationalist. She was replaced by a pro-Kremlin journalist.

He acquired sports betting firm Rambler in 2016, selling a 46.5 percent stake to Sberbank in December 2019. Mamut was subsequently involved in an intellectual property rights dispute between Rambler and Sberbank.

A&NN acquired two Moscow art-house cinemas, also showing some foreign mass market films - “Pioneer” in 2008, and the Khudozhestvenny in 2016. In 2017, they acquired movie chains Cinema Park and Formula Kino.

In 2020, Mamut sold Rambler to Sberbank.

Personal life
Mamut is a widower from his second marriage. He has five children. As of 2016, he resides in Moscow, Russia, and has a secondary residence in Kensington, London. He also owns a yacht.  He has given grants of £200,000 to Eton College.

Rambler Group

Sberbank acquired 45% of shares in Rambler Group from Alexander Mamut in 2020 whereby the share of Sberbank in Rambler Group was increase to 100%

Notes

References

Living people
1960 births
Russian philanthropists
Russian billionaires
Moscow State University alumni
Businesspeople from Moscow
People from Kensington
Russian businesspeople in the United Kingdom